Kudiya  is a minor Dravidian language spoken by a Scheduled tribe of India.

References

Dravidian languages